Barbarine may refer to:

 the Barbarine, a rock formation in the German part of the Elbe Sandstone Mountains
 the Tunisian Barbarin, a Tunisian breed of fat-tailed sheep

See also 

 Barbarin (disambiguation)